Apostle Sunday Popoola is a Nigerian pastor and the General Overseer of Word Communication Ministries and the presiding Apostle and Founder of Christ Family Assembly Churches.

Ministry
The Popoola ministry includes:
 Roots Outreach (Children Ministry)
 Publication Ministry
 Leadership Conferences
 Christ Family Assembly (Churches)
 Media Ministry (T.V. Radio, E-media)
 International College of Ministries
 Mamlakah: Mercy Ministrty (Poor Widows, Rural Settlements, Street Gangs)
 Apostolic Mentoring Network (AMEN)
 The SCEPTRE (Leadership Formation Centre)
 Men for Real  Ministry
 The Women's Ministries: - The Unique Woman, Mothers of the Mighty, Women Intercessory Network
 Bone of my Bone Marriage Enrichment Campaigns

Family 
He is married to Omowumi, a lawyer turned preacher, who works with him in the ministry. They have four children.

References

External links
Word Communication Ministries official site

1942 births
Living people
People from Osun State
University of Lagos alumni
Academic staff of the University of Lagos
University of Nigeria alumni
Academic staff of the University of Ilorin
Nigerian Pentecostal pastors
Prosperity theologians